Waidbruck (Ladin: Pruca) is a comune (municipality) in South Tyrol in northern Italy, located about  northeast of Bolzano.

Geography

Waidbruck borders the following municipalities: Barbian, Kastelruth and Lajen.

History

Place name
An archaic form of the comune'''s name, Waidepruk (1264), reveals its origins from Old High German. Waid means "meadow" and pruk means "bridge". Hence also the Italian name, "Ponte Gardena".

Coat-of-arms
The emblem symbolizes the bridge; argent a fess nebuly gules on azure that indicates the Eisack river. The reason comes from the gules and argent insignia of the counts of Wolkenstein, owners of the local Trostburg'' Castle since 1385. The emblem was adopted in 1969.

Society

Linguistic distribution
According to the 2011 census, 81.40% of the population speak German, 13.37% Italian and 5.23% Ladin as first language.

Demographic evolution

References

External links

 Homepage of the municipality

Municipalities of South Tyrol